The 2011 season is the 57th season of Pakistan domestic football and the 8th season of the Pakistan Premier League, and started on 5 July 2011 under the auspices of Pakistan Football Federation (PFF). The season ending on 29 December with mid season break between 30 July and 14 September. 

KRL F.C. under head coach Tariq Lufti were crowned champions after losing only one game the whole season. They also took the winners prize of Rs 700,000. Afghan Club were the surprise of the season after finished second, the first time since the PPL started that a non-departmental club finished in the top three and took Rs 500,00. Pakistan Army F.C. finished third and were given Rs 400,00. 

PIA F.C. took the Fair-Play trophy and Rs 100,000. Cheques of Rs 100,000 each were handed over to the leading scorer Jadeed Khan Pathan (Afghan Club, 22 goals) and the best goalkeeper Jaffar Khan (Pakistan Army F.C.). 

The best player award and a prize of Rs 150,000 went to KRL F.C.’s skipper Samar Ishaq. Rs100,000 each went to the best referee Waheed Murad and the best match commissioner Zaman Khan from Rawalpindi. The best assistant referee Adnan Anjum received Rs50,000. Pakistan Police F.C. and PEL F.C. were both relegated.

Format
Teams play each other on a home and away basis

The winners will represent Pakistan at the 2012 AFC President's Cup. The bottom two teams will be relegated to the Pakistan Football Federation League.

Teams

SSGC F.C. and Young Blood F.C. were relegated at the end of the 2010 campaign and were replaced by Muslim F.C. and Pakistan Police F.C., both representing the city of Quetta.

Location and stadia

League standings

Statistics

Hat-tricks 

4 Player scored four goals

Champions

References

External links 
End of season

Pakistan Premier League seasons
1
Pakistan